John Langford Hayward (26 April 1923 – 24 February 2013), was a British breast surgeon who researched treatment for advanced breast cancer. In 1945, while studying medicine at Guy's Hospital, he assisted with the Relief effort at Bergen-Belsen concentration camp as a voluntary medical student. He graduated in 1947.

See also
List of London medical students who assisted at Belsen

References 

20th-century British medical doctors
London medical students who assisted at Belsen
1945 in medicine
1923 births
2013 deaths